The Brazilian Beer Festival is a beer festival in Brazil. The festival showcases the different kinds of beer in Brazil, including Brazilian Beer Awards winners, and is promoted by ABRADEG.

References

Beer festivals in Brazil
Beer in Brazil